The Month of the Leopard is a book written by Matthew Lynn under the pen name James Harland.

Plot summary

The Month of the Leopard tells the story of a man whose life falls apart when he discovers a horrifying link between his Estonian wife's mysterious disappearance and the powerful and complex Leopard Fund.

Reception
Kirkus Reviews wrote, "Tension, pitifully lacking in the first two thirds of this grand adventure for MBAs, finally arrives, but nonbankers will probably have bailed out by then".

Publishers Weekly noted, "There are problems: flat characterizations, gratuitous violence, unconvincing motivation for Telmont and a too-hasty denouement. But the book is a page-turner for anyone interested in high-stakes financial shenanigans".

References

2002 novels
Legal thriller novels